Henry Acker (June 6, 1804August 31, 1874 or 1875) was an American politician who served as a member of the Michigan House of Representatives and then as a member of the Minnesota House of Representatives.

Early life 
Acker was born on June 6, 1804, likely in New York.

Political career 
Acker served two terms in the Michigan House of Representatives, first being elected on November 5, 1838. He was then sworn in on January 7, 1839. When he was re-elected in 1840, he also served as Speaker of the Michigan House of Representatives. In 1857, Acker moved to Minnesota, where he would serve two terms in the Minnesota House of Representatives. Sometime between being elected the Michigan and Minnesota legislature, Acker switched from being a Whig to a Republican.

Personal life 
Acker married a woman named Amanda, and together they had four children, one of them being Captain William H. Acker, who was killed in the Battle of Shiloh in 1862.

Death 
Acker's death date is disputed. Some sources claim he died on August 31, 1875, but his grave at Oakland Cemetery in Saint Paul, Ramsey County, Minnesota claims he died on the same day in 1874.

References 

1804 births
1870s deaths
Speakers of the Michigan House of Representatives
Republican Party members of the Michigan House of Representatives
Members of the Minnesota House of Representatives
Michigan Whigs
Minnesota Republicans
Burials in Minnesota
19th-century American politicians